Simon Fredrik Hedlund (born 11 March 1993) is a Swedish professional footballer who plays as a forward for Danish Superliga club Brøndby IF.

Hedlund joined IF Elfsborg at the age of 16 and debuted in the Allsvenskan in 2012. In 2016, he moved to Union Berlin for a club record €850,000 before signing for Brøndby IF for €250,000 two and a half years later, in January 2019. In Denmark, he developed a strong partnership in attack with first top goalscorer Kamil Wilczek and since Mikael Uhre and became noted for his pace and pressing abilities.

Hedlund has represented Sweden at different youth levels and made his under-21 debut in 2012. He was called up to the senior team in 2020, and scored his first goal for the national team in his second appearance.

Club career

Elfsborg
Born in Trollhättan, Västra Götaland County, Hedlund joined the youth system of IF Elfsborg when he was 16 years old, after having played for hometown clubs IFK Trollhättan and FC Trollhättan. There, he made his professional debut on 12 August 2012 in a 4–1 league win over Malmö FF, coming on as a late substitute for Niklas Hult. At the end of the season, Elfsborg won the Swedish league title. He was also a part of the Elfsborg team that won the Swedish Cup in 2014. On 31 July 2014, Hedlund made his first goal in European competition, scoring on a penalty kick in the 89th minute in a 4–1 win over Icelandic club FH in the third qualifying round of the Europa League.

During his time in Elfsborg, Hedlund made 93 league appearances in which he scored 14 goals. He also scored nine goals in 20 appearances in the Swedish Cup and made 17 total appearances in the Champions League and UEFA Europa League.

Union Berlin
On 29 August 2016, Hedlund signed a four-year contract with 2. Bundesliga club, 1. FC Union Berlin. The transfer made him the most expensive purchase by the club at the time. Hedlund made his debut on 21 September, as a substitute in an away game against Würzburger Kickers which Union won 1–0. He finished the 2016–17 season with 29 appearances in which he scored three goals.

Hedlund missed just three league matches during the 2017–18 season as Union finished eighth in the league. However, the following season he saw less playing time, as Union would eventually push for promotion to the Bundesliga just months after he left the club. Hedlund departed the Stadion An der Alten Försterei in January 2019, after making 75 appearances and scoring 11 goals for the club.

Brøndby
On 11 January 2019, Hedlund moved to Denmark to join Superliga club Brøndby IF on a four-and-a-half year contract for a fee rumoured to be around €250,000. He was assigned shirt number 27 by the club. Hedlund scored his first goal for the club in a 2–2 home draw against OB on 29 March. He made the final of the Danish Cup in his first six months in Brøndby, a match against FC Midtjylland which was eventually lost on penalties. Hedlund finished the 2018–19 season with four goals from 19 appearances. On 30 June 2020, Hedlund and teammate Samuel Mráz tested positive for COVID-19, ruling them out for at least a week.

Before a match against FC Midtjylland on 24 October 2020, Hedlund was not selected for the matchday squad, giving rise to speculation to about the reasons. Brøndby head coach Niels Frederiksen explained that other players had impressed more during practice, and that the decision of not including Hedlund was "not a disciplinary punishment". He would, however, finish the season strong as a key part of the Brøndby offense alongside top goalscorer Mikael Uhre and Jesper Lindstrøm as the club won its first Danish Superliga in 16 years. Hedlund contributed with nine goals and nine assists in 33 appearances in the club's title-winning season, and was voted Superliga Player of the Month for May 2021 for his performances.

On 3 March 2023, Hedlund extended his contract with Brøndby by two years until 2025.

International career
Hedlund has represented Sweden as an international at various youth levels.

On 9 January 2020, Hedlund made his debut for the Sweden national team in a friendly against Moldova, a match that ended in a 1–0 win for Sweden. In his second match, a 1–0 win over Kosovo on 12 January, Hedlund scored his first international goal, which secured the win for Sweden.

Style of play
Hedlund has been described as a player with an "aggressive and direct playing style", who can play in multiple offensive positions. Renowned for his pace with and without the ball at his feet, Hedlund has described himself as a "hard worker", and was praised for evolving into a true team-player during his time at Brøndby by head coach Niels Frederiksen.

Personal life
Hedlund is of Finnish descent through his Finnish mother. In June 2020, Hedlund married longtime girlfriend, Sandra Isabel, in Sweden.

Career statistics

Club

International

Scores and results list Sweden's goal tally first, score column indicates score after each Hedlund goal.

Honours
Elfsborg
 Allsvenskan: 2012
 Svenska Cupen: 2013–14

Brøndby
 Danish Superliga: 2020–21

Individual
 Brøndby Player of the Month: February 2019, March 2019
 Superliga Player of the Month: May 2021

References

External links
 
 

1993 births
Living people
Swedish footballers
Sweden international footballers
Sweden under-21 international footballers
Sweden youth international footballers
Allsvenskan players
2. Bundesliga players
Danish Superliga players
IF Elfsborg players
1. FC Union Berlin players
Brøndby IF players
Swedish expatriate footballers
Expatriate men's footballers in Denmark
Association football midfielders
Association football forwards
Swedish people of Finnish descent
Swedish expatriate sportspeople in Germany
Swedish expatriate sportspeople in Denmark
People from Trollhättan
Sportspeople from Västra Götaland County